The 2013 London Grand Prix Gold was the twelfth grand prix gold and grand prix tournament of the 2013 BWF Grand Prix Gold and Grand Prix. The tournament was held in The Copper Box Arena, London, England October 1 until October 6, 2013 and had a total purse of $120,000.

Men's singles

Seeds

  Jan O Jorgensen (third round)
  Hans-Kristian Vittinghus (final)
  Viktor Axelsen (semi-final)
  Rajiv Ouseph (semi-final)
  Tan Chun Seang (third round)
  Mohd Arif Abdul Latif (withdrew)
  Ville Lang (third round)
  Derek Wong Zi Liang (quarter-final)

Finals

Top half

Section 1

Section 2

Section 3

Section 4

Bottom half

Section 5

Section 6

Section 7

Section 8

Women's singles

Seeds

  Busanan Ongbumrungpan (semi-final)
  Porntip Buranaprasertsuk (first round)
  Carolina Marin (champion)
  Sashina Vignes Waran (second round)
  Kirsty Gilmour (final)
  Kristina Gavnholt (semi-final)
  Karin Schnaase (first round)
  Deng Xuan (quarter-final)

Finals

Top half

Section 1

Section 2

Bottom half

Section 3

Section 4

Men's doubles

Seeds

  Mathias Boe / Carsten Mogensen (champion)
  Chris Langridge / Peter Mills (second round)
  Marcus Ellis /  Paul Van Rietvelde (second round)
  Wahyu Nayaka / Ade Yusuf (semi-final)

Finals

Top half

Section 1

Section 2

Bottom half

Section 3

Section 4

Women's doubles

Seeds

  Christinna Pedersen / Kamilla Rytter Juhl (champion)
  Birgit Michels / Johanna Goliszewski (second round)
  Shinta Mulia Sari / Yao Lei (semi-final)
  Heather Olver / Kate Robertshaw (quarter-final)

Finals

Top half

Section 1

Section 2

Bottom half

Section 3

Section 4

Mixed doubles

Seeds

  Danny Bawa Chrisnanta / Vanessa Neo Yu Yan (semi-final)
  Michael Fuchs / Birgit Michels (champion)
  Chris Langridge / Heather Olver (final)
  Irfan Fadhilah / Weni Anggraini (semi-final)

Finals

Top half

Section 1

Section 2

Bottom half

Section 3

Section 4

References

2013 in English sport
International sports competitions in London
London Grand Prix Gold
London Grand Prix Gold